Thomas Prinz (born June 7, 1959) is a German diplomat. He served as the Director General, German Institute Taipei since 2018, and German Ambassador to Bangladesh from April 2015 to 2018.

Education and early career
Thomas Prinz graduated from University of Heidelberg. He complete his PhD from South Asia Institute and also attended in University of Giessen.

Foreign Service career
 1998 – 2005: Participation in EU Election Observation missions
 1990 – 1992: Federal Foreign Office, Bonn, Attaché
 1992 – 1993: Federal Foreign Office, Bonn, 2nd Secretary, Cultural Department
 1993 – 1997: German Embassy, Bucarest, 1st Secretary, Political
 1997 – 2000: German Embassy Jakarta, 1st Secretary, Cultural Affairs
 2000 – 2005: EU-Division, Federal Foreign Office, Berlin, Counselor
 2005 – 2007: Dep. Director, Public Diplomacy of the German EU – Presidency – Division, Federal Foreign Office, Berlin
 2007 – 2008: International Security Assistance Force (ISAF), Kabul, Political Advisor to COMISAF 
 2008 – 2010: German Embassy Tokyo, Political Counselor
 2010 – 2010: German Consulate General Shanghai, Head of the Economic Department
 2010 – 2011: German Embassy Canberra, Deputy Head of Mission
 2011 – 2012; Senior Political Advisor, Directorate General for Strategy and Missions, Federal Ministry of Defense, Berlin
 2012 – 2015: Director Foreign Trade Promotion, Federal Foreign Office, Berlin Division, Federal Foreign Office, Berlin
 2015 – 2018: German Embassy Dhaka, Ambassador to Bangladesh

Bibliography
 Die Geschichte der United National Party in Sri Lanka, Dissertation Ruprecht-Karls-Universität Heidelberg, Stuttgart 1990, .
 Mode, Mord und Models, Düsseldorf 1995, .
 Ankunft in Bukarest, Cologne 2000, .
 Abschied von Jakarta, Cologne 2001, .
 Der Unterhändler der Hanse: Ein Hansekrimi, Hamburg 2005, Re-issued version 2012, .
 Das Silber der Ostsee: Ein Hansekrimi, Hamburg 2006, .

Awards
Grand Medal of Diplomacy (2021) –  Republic of China

Family
Thomas Prinz has five children.

References

Further reading
 
 

1959 births
Living people
Ambassadors of Germany to Bangladesh
Director Generals of the German Institute Taipei